John Proctor Darragh (December 4, 1890 – June 28, 1924) was a Canadian professional ice hockey player. Darragh played the forward position for the Ottawa Senators in the National Hockey League (NHL) and its predecessor the National Hockey Association (NHA). Darragh was a member of four Stanley Cup championship teams (1911, 1920, 1921, 1923) and a NHA championship team (1915).

He was inducted into the Hockey Hall of Fame in 1962.

He was an older brother of NHL player Harold Darragh.

Playing career
Jack Darragh made a meteoric jump directly from the amateur ranks to professional hockey, without any schooling in the junior game, going from playing with all of Ottawa Stewartons (OCSHL), Fort Coulonge (Pontiac Hockey League) and Ottawa Cliffsides (IPAHU) in three different amateur leagues in 1909–10, to earn a place with the Ottawa Senators of the NHA at the beginning of the 1910–11 campaign when Horace Gaul got injured against the Montreal Canadiens.

Darragh was signed to his first professional contract by then Ottawa Senators manager Pete Green, at the restaurant Uwanta Lunch at Sparks Street in Ottawa, to the modest amount of $15 per week. He soon established himself as an important piece of the team and during the 1914–15 season he was chosen team captain, a role that Horace Merrill took over the following year in 1915–16.

Darragh played his entire professional career with the Ottawa Senators. He was a big part of their success, winning four Stanley Cups; in 1911, 1920, 1921 and 1923. Darragh's skillset included a particular penchant for clutch scoring; he potted all three game-winning goals against the Seattle Metropolitans in 1920, and in the 1921 Stanley Cup Finals against Vancouver Millionaires, he scored both goals in a 2–1 deciding game victory.

He retired after the 1921 Stanley Cup win, but returned after one season to play for the Stanley Cup-winning team of 1922–23, the third in four seasons, all with Darragh in the lineup.

During his last NHL season in 1923–24 Darragh suffered a broken right knee cap after having collided with Edmond Bouchard of the Hamilton Tigers in a game at the Ottawa Auditorium, which held him off the ice for parts of the season.

Darragh retired for a second time after the 1923–24 season and died a few months later due to peritonitis, which was the result of a ruptured appendix. He was survived by his wife Elizabeth and his three daughters Aileen, Frances and Marion. Darragh was the third player from the 1911 Stanley Cup winning Ottawa Senators team that had died within less than 10 years, following Marty Walsh (tuberculosis 1915) and Hamby Shore (influenza 1918), and he was followed by Bruce Ridpath who died in 1925 after having suffered a stroke.

Playing style
Although without any background in organized junior hockey, Jack Darragh was a good skater and had speed to burn to go along with much grit and determination, playing a fast and strong game on the forward line. While considered a clean and gentlemanly player, Darragh still carried a fair amount of pluck to his game, and during the 1913–14 NHA season he led the Ottawa Senators with 69 penalty minutes. A right winger position wise, Darragh had good chemistry on the Ottawa Senators forward line with centre forward Frank Nighbor, and the two players developed a system of team play between each other over the years that carried the Senators to many victories. At the onset of his hockey career, up until 1911, Darragh played as a rover, the more free-roaming position between defence and the forward line, but when the NHA abandoned the seven-man game prior to the 1911–12 season and the rover was taken out of the game, he switched to right wing instead. He also occasionally played on the left wing.

The June 30, 1924 obituary in the Ottawa Citizen mentioned, as pointed out by officers of the Ottawa Senators, that Darragh was a "model athlete" who never smoked or tasted liquor in any form, and that he "trained assiduously both in and out of the hockey seasons and always kept himself in perfect condition." According to the newspaper Darragh was a "beautiful specimen of an athlete and his weight, coupled with terrific speed and magnificent stickhandling, made him a terror to opposing teams."

With his good physique and strong conditioning Darragh could play at a high level throughout the entirety of the games, which made him a strong third period threat with a penchant for clutch scoring. One such instance happened in the 1920 Stanley Cup Finals against the Seattle Metropolitans where the fifth and deciding game between the two teams stood at 1-1 after two periods. But in the third period Darragh and his teammates on the Ottawa forward line skated the Metropolitans off their feet and scored five goals for a 6-1 victory, with Darragh himself recording a hat-trick.

In his younger days Darragh had been a lacrosse player of great promise, playing with the Ottawa Stars lacrosse team, before throwing himself in with the game of hockey. He was also into distance running, and he also held down a place on the baseball team of his employer at the Ottawa Dairy Company. At his residence on Java Avenue in Ottawa, just prior to his death, he had also built an adjoining clay tennis court to train on.

Career statistics

* Stanley Cup Champion.

Awards and achievements
 Stanley Cup champion: 1911, 1920, 1921, 1923
 1962 – Inducted into the Hockey Hall of Fame.

See also
List of ice hockey players who died during their playing career

References

Bibliography

Notes

External links
 
 

1890 births
1924 deaths
Deaths from peritonitis
Hockey Hall of Fame inductees
Ice hockey people from Ottawa
Ottawa Senators (1917) players
Ottawa Senators (NHA) players
Ottawa Senators (original) players
Stanley Cup champions
Canadian ice hockey right wingers